Sylvain Cossette (born May 8, 1963) is a French-Canadian singer from Grand-Mère, Quebec (located in the Mauricie region). He was a founding member of the Quebec-based English-language band Paradox in 1984 before becoming a French-language solo artist by 1994.

Career
During his career he has sold over one million albums (12 Gold and Platinum), recorded thirty-two No. 1 hit songs and eight Number 1 albums, earned six Silver, Gold and Platinum Tickets, won 10 Quebec Felix Music Awards, six Socan awards and four Juno nominations, and performed in Canada and Europe in the hit stage musicals Notre Dame De Paris and Dracula. Cossette's 2001 album Rendez-vous was certified Platinum by the CRIA in November 2002.

Discography

 Paradox (1989)
 Obvious Puzzle (Paradox) (1991)
 Comme l'océan (1994)
 Blanc (1996)
 Humain (1999)
 Rendez-vous (2001)
 Compilation 1994–2004 (2004)
 Les 7 (2006 family musical theatre)
 70s (2007)
 70s Volume 2 (2008)
 70s Volume 3 (2010)
 Mes Succès Francophones Volumes 1&2 (2011)
 Le jour d'après (October 2012)
 Retrospective (September 2013)
 Les numéros 1 (April 2014)
 Accords (October 2014)
 Lily et le Lutin (November 2014 children's musical theatre)
 Lily et le Lutin chantent noel (November 2015 children's musical theatre)
 Pyjama Party (November 2016 children's musical theatre)
 Café et Guitares (March 2017 instrumental)

See also
List of Mauriciens
List of Quebec musicians
Music of Quebec
Culture of Quebec

References

External links
 SYLVAIN COSSETTE Official website
 MARK VINET MANAGEMENT Official website

1963 births
Canadian pop singers
Canadian male singers
French Quebecers
French-language singers of Canada
Living people
Singers from Quebec
Félix Award winners
People from Shawinigan